Canis is a genus which includes dogs, wolves and jackals.

Canis may also refer to:

People with the surname
 Cornelius Canis (between 1500 and 1510–1561), Franco-Flemish composer of the Renaissance

Astronomy
 Canis Major, the 'big dog' constellation
 Canis Minor, the 'small dog' constellation
 Canes Venatici, the hunting dogs
 Canis Major Dwarf Galaxy
 Tau Canis Majoris Cluster, an open cluster of stars

Places
 Canis District in the Ancash Region, Peru
 Canis Resort, the world's first luxury dog hotel located in Freising, Germany

Other
 Stercus canis officinale, the dung of dogs or hyenas that has become white through exposure to air used in dressing leather

See also
 Including use as a species name